Mansion House, located near Public Landing, Maryland, United States, is an early-to-mid-19th century plantation house built as the main residence of a forced-labor farm of more than 250 acres. This "telescoping house" was built in five main parts beginning about 1835. The distinct blocks were designed in a manner that separated the main house from the enslaved servants' quarters while keeping them close at hand.

Mansion House was listed on the National Register of Historic Places in 1995.

References

External links
, including photo from 1994, at Maryland Historical Trust

Houses on the National Register of Historic Places in Maryland
Houses in Worcester County, Maryland
Houses completed in 1835
Plantation houses in Maryland
National Register of Historic Places in Worcester County, Maryland